Castiglione del Lago is a town in the province of Perugia of Umbria (central Italy), on the southwest corner of Lake Trasimeno.

Geography and urban structure

Castiglione del Lago has evolved on what used to be an island - the fourth island of Lake Trasimeno, in its south west region.  Over the centuries, as the town grew, the flat gap between the island and the shore was filled with piazzas, houses, churches and other buildings.

The newest parts of the city are at some distance from the old, so the centro storico (historical center) of Castiglione del Lago is a well-preserved medieval locality that seems to be governed by a "law of threes".  In the town walls there are three gates, and inside the town there are three piazzas and three churches.

History
Castiglione lies on the once important highway between Orvieto to the south, Chiusi  to the west, and Arezzo to the north.  Its position in this hotly disputed territory, pitting Etruscans against Romans, and later Tuscans against Perugians, inevitably brought a long cycle of death and destruction to the town.  The original fortifications were destroyed and rebuilt on numerous occasions.

It was only during and following the reign of Emperor Frederick II (early 13th century) that a period of relative stability ensued.

Later the city fell under the control of Perugia, within the Papal States, becoming the fiefdom of the powerful Baglioni family.  In 1550, Pope Julius III bestowed it upon his sister.  In 1563, her son, Ascanio della Corgna, became the Marquis of Castiglione and Chiusi.  The fiefdom became a prosperous, but short-lived Duchy in 1617. The last Duke Fulvio Alessandro (1617-1647) died without heirs and the town was re-absorbed into the Papal States.

Main sights

The Fortress of the Lion was built by Emperor Frederick II.  The pentagonal-shaped castle, was completed in 1247 CE by the monk-architect Elia from Cortona. The castle features square towers in four of its  corners and a triangular shaped bastion, or donjon, known as the Mastio in the other.  The castle was designed to give its owners strategic control over all of Lake Trasimeno.  The castle has withstood a number of sieges over the subsequent centuries.

The Palazzo della Corgna which serves as the Palazzo del Comune (Town Hall) was built by Ascanio della Corgna in Renaissance style, designed by the architect Vignola. It is now a civic museum and gallery. The palazzo has by a long, covered corridor connecting to the castle.  On the main floor, late Renaissance era frescoes were painted by the Pescaro-born artist Giovanni Antonio Pandolfi and the Florentine artist Salvio Savini.  In 1574, the artist Niccolò Circignani, known as "Il Pomarancio", added paintings and other decorations to one of the most interesting rooms in the palazzo, the so-called Room of the Exploits of the overlord Ascanio della Corgna.

The only other building of particular note is the finely stucco-ed Church of Santa Maria Maddalena, done on a Greek-cross plan.  The church has a neo-classical pronaos and, inside, a panel painted in 1580 by Eusebio da San Giorgio.

Culture
Every two years, Castiglione del Lago is the host of the Coloriamo i Cieli festival.  The "Colour the Skies" event is held on no fixed date in late April or May. Since 2005, however, this festival has been held annually and now includes light aircraft (nearly 2000 in 2007), hot air balloons (17) and thousands of multi coloured kites.

Notable people
Saint Margaret of Cortona was born here in 1247
Andrea Antonelli, a World Supersport rider and native of Castiglione del Lago, died in a crash at the Moscow Raceway in 2013.
Stefano Okaka, born in 1989, football player

Twin towns
 Trappes, France, since 1971
 Kopřivnice, Czech Republic, since 1997
 Lempäälä, Finland, since 2005

See also
 Ascanio della Corgna
 Lake Trasimeno

References

Sources
 Maria Gabriella Donati-Guerrieri, Lo Stato di Castiglione del Lago e i della Corgna, La Grafica, Perugia 1972.

External links

Official website
 Bill Thayer's Gazetteer of Italy

Castles in Italy